Dichomeris erixantha is a moth in the family Gelechiidae. It was described by Edward Meyrick in 1914. It is found in Malawi and Zimbabwe.

The wingspan is 16–20 mm. The forewings are deep ochreous yellow. The hindwings are dark grey.

References

Moths described in 1914
erixantha